Stuart Graham (born 31 August 1967) is a Northern Irish film, television, and stage actor, born and brought up in Northern Ireland.

Life
Born in Belfast and educated at the University of Ulster, where he took a degree in media studies, Graham trained for an acting career at a drama school in London. In 1990 he played a minor part in a revival of Berenice at the Cottesloe Theatre, Lambeth, and in 1991 appeared at the Dublin Theatre Festival in a production of Michael Collins Big Fella! by the Praxis Theatre Laboratory of Greenwich, playing the part of Eoin O'Duffy.

Most of Graham's stage work has been in Dublin and Belfast, while in film and television he has worked in both Irish and British productions, specializing in playing Irishmen. However, his leading roles have included the part of the Englishman Howard Carter in Egypt (2005).

In 2000, Graham directed the premiere of Gary Mitchell's new play, Marching On, at the Lyric Theatre, Belfast.

In an interview in 2011, Graham commented 

In April 2017, he appeared in The Ferryman at the Royal Court Theatre, ahead of a transfer to the Gielgud Theatre in the West End.

Filmography
Michael Collins (1996) – Thomas Cullen
The Informant (1997) – Det. Astley
One Man's Hero (1999) – Corporal Kenneally
Misery Harbour (1999) – John Wakefield
Song for a Raggy Boy (2003) – Brother Whelan
Omagh (2004) – Victor Barker
Hunger (2008) – Raymond Lohan
The Whistleblower (2010) – McVeigh
Parked (2010) – George O'Regan
Christopher and His Kind (2011) – Passport officer
Tinker Tailor Soldier Spy (2011) – Minister
Grabbers (2012) – Skipper
Shadow Dancer (2012) – Ian Gilmore
A Patch of Fog (2015) - Tom Breslin
Mary Shelley (2017) - Publisher
The Foreigner (2017) - Detective Inspector Donald Greig

Selected television work

Shockers: Cyclops (Channel 4 television film, 2001) - Carl Gatliss
Egypt (BBC television series, 2005) – Howard Carter
Waterloo Road (BBC television series, 2007) – Russell Millen
Single-Handed (RTÉ Television series, 2007) – Johnny Mallon
The Fall (BBC television series, 2013–2016) – DCI Matt Eastwood
Our World War (BBC television series, 2014) – Father Brookes
Thirteen (BBC television series, 2016) – Angus Moxam
The Secret (ITV television series, 2016) – Dave Stewart
Vera (ITV television series, 2017) - Alan Marston
The Wheel of Time (Amazon Prime Video series, TBA) - Geofram Bornhald

On stage
Berenice (1990) at the Cottesloe Theatre, Lambeth (a Royal National Theatre production)
Michael Collins Big Fella! (1991) at the St George's Theatre, Dublin (Praxis Theatre Laboratory of Greenwich, at Dublin Theatre Festival, 1991)
The Silver Tassie (1994) at the Almeida Theatre, London
Alternative Future (1994) at the Old Museum Arts Centre, Belfast
In a Little World of Our Own (1997) at the Abbey Theatre, Dublin
As the Beast Sleeps (1997) at the Abbey Theatre, Dublin
Carthaginians (1999) at the Lyric Theatre, Belfast
Force of Change (2000) at the Royal Court Theatre, Kensington
A Number (2007) at the Peacock Theatre, Dublin
Pump Girl (2008) at the Queen's Drama Studio, Belfast
The Painkiller (2011) at the Lyric Theatre, Belfast
The Ferryman (2017) at the Royal Court Theatre and Gielgud Theatre, London

References

External links

1967 births
Living people
Alumni of Ulster University
Male film actors from Northern Ireland